Eru is a soup from Cameroon. It is a specialty of the Bayangi people, of the Manyu region in southwestern Cameroon. It is vegetable soup made up of finely shredded leaves of the eru or okok. The eru is stewed with waterleaf or spinach, palm oil, crayfish, and either smoked fish, cow skin (kanda) or beef.

This dish is traditionally eaten with fermented water-fufu or garri.

Eru Recipe

See also 
 Cuisine of Cameroon
 List of African dishes
 List of vegetable soups

References

 

Cameroonian cuisine
Vegetable soups